Rachel Veltri (born February 26, 1978, in Chicago, Illinois) is an American actress and model.  Veltri came to prominence on the television show, For Love or Money.  To coincide with the release of American Pie Presents: Band Camp, she posed nude for Playboy magazine in the December 2005 issue.

Filmography 
The Director's Choice (short) (2010) - Director's Assistant
Bones (2010) TV Series - Harriet Soloway (1 episode)
Rodney (2008) - Flight Attendant (1 episode)
Trapped Ashes (2006) - Phoebe
Pray for Morning (2005) - Bunny
The King of Queens (2005) TV Series - Vanessa (1 episode)
American Pie Presents: Band Camp (2005) (V) - Dani
For Love or Money seasons 3 and 4 (2004) TV Series - Herself

External links

1978 births
Living people
Participants in American reality television series
Actresses from Chicago
Actresses from Illinois
American film actresses
American television actresses
21st-century American actresses